Mike Le Mare (died October 2020) was an American sound engineer. He was nominated for the Academy Awards for Best Sound and Best Sound Editing for the film Das Boot. Le Mare died on October 19, 2020.

Selected filmography
 Blow-Up (1966)
 Das Boot (1981)
 The Terminator (1984)
 The NeverEnding Story (1984)
 New Jack City (1991)
 The Thief and the Cobbler (1993)
 Andersonville (1996)
 Path to War (2002)

References

External links

Year of birth missing
2020 deaths
American audio engineers